YMCA Camp Minikani is a residential summer camp located along the shores of Lake Amy Belle in Hubertus, in Washington County, Wisconsin, United States. YMCA Camp Minikani was established in 1919 by the Milwaukee YMCA. Minikani is also home to Amy Belle Lake. At its conception, Minikani served as a summer camp for boys living in the Milwaukee area who came for two weeks to learn camp skills and participated in competitive athletic events.  Minikani has since transformed to a co-ed camp that has shifted from competitive activities to challenge by choice to eliminate the emotional pressure of competitions. Minikani still offers its traditional summer programs such as the Pioneer Unit, the Trail Blazer Unit, and the Explorer Unit, and has since begun to offer day camp and equestrian camps.

Etymology 
The word Minikani stems from Native American roots and is believed to have a double meaning.  In Menomonee, the word Menukunee means "a place of beginnings", and in Chippewa a different word, Minikani, means "a place where seeds are planted".  This double meaning is appropriate to the mission of YMCA summer camps to provide a place for children to participate in new activities and become comfortable in social settings with other campers.

History 
Minikani was established in 1919 as a residential summer camp for boys from the age of eight to sixteen to participate in outdoor camping skills and athletic competition.  The boys would be trained in Milwaukee to stay for two weeks where they stayed in teepees

In the 1960s camp shifted from competitive activities to more challenge by choice activities that didn't bring about pressures from competition. In 1967, Minikani offered its first girls' overnight camp program. In the 1980s Minikani started a leadership training program which has since become its staple program in developing young campers into responsible counselors.  In 2006, Minikani added an equestrian center and added a day camp option to its list of summer programs.

Units 

The Pioneer and Trailblazer (formerly Indian) Units for the resident summer program for campers from ages eight to thirteen. Campers have the option of attending for one or two weeks where they participate in activities such as sailing, boating, archery, camp skills, nature, rock climbing and ropes course, horseback riding, swimming, and frisbee golf, soccer, .22 rifle, and air rifle. The Pioneer Unit is made up of nine cabins. Cabins 10-17 are all separate from the continuous Pioneer Unit, with cabins 18 and 19 located on the waterfront, farther away from the rest of the unit. Most cabins in the Pioneer Unit are named after cattle brands used during Western Expansion.

The Explorer Unit allows campers to attend camp for one week to learn outdoor camping and adventure skills followed by the second week on a camping trip in Rhinelander in northern Wisconsin.  The Explorer develops whitewater canoeing skills, backpacking skills, the knowledge to maintain a clean and efficient base camp, and the ability to build strong relationships. Campers in the explorer program are ages 13,14 and 15 and are paired with another cabin for the week up north. This is also the feeder program into the Leadership Training program, which develops the leadership skills to become a full-time counselor at camp.

Added in 2006 due to a neighboring camp closing, Minikani inherited the equestrian and day camp programs.  An equestrian center was constructed on a newly purchased plot of land allowing resident or day equestrian programs.  These campers train with a knowledgeable instructional staff and learn horse care and riding techniques.  The day camp program allows campers to participate in individual activities and the residential campers with afternoon group activities with the rest of the unit.

References

Buildings and structures in Washington County, Wisconsin
Minikani
Minikani